Burgheim is a municipality in the Neuburg-Schrobenhausen district in the state of Bavaria in Germany.  It is a market town.

Divisions

The municipality contains:
Burgheim
Biding
Dezenacker
Eschling
Illdorf
Kunding
Leidling
Längloh
Moos
Ortlfing
Straß
Wengen

Note
There is a municipality in the same district named Bergheim.

References

External links
www.burgheim.de — official website (in German)

Neuburg-Schrobenhausen